Jean Firmin Marbeau (1798 – October 10, 1875) was a French philanthropist who pioneered the crèche movement, a forerunner of modern day care.

Marbeau was born in Brive-la-Gaillarde, and was by profession a lawyer in Paris. He is best known for founding the first crèche, which opened in Paris on November 14, 1844. The crèche provided child care to enable working-class mothers to work jobs outside of the home, and spawned a Crèche Movement that led to a number of similar establishments being opened in France; the concept was also influential on the development of day care in North America. Marbeau wrote a number of books promoting the concept, and died in Saint-Cloud in 1875.

Writings
 Politique des intérêts (1834)
 Études sur l'économie sociale (1844)
 Des crèches (1845)
 Du paupérisme en France (1847)
 De l'indigence et des secours (1850)

References

External links
 
 
 

1798 births
1875 deaths
French non-fiction writers
French male non-fiction writers
19th-century French writers
Burials at Père Lachaise Cemetery
Officiers of the Légion d'honneur
19th-century French philanthropists